Senanga is a constituency of the National Assembly of Zambia. It covers Senanga and surrounding areas in Senanga District of Western Province.

List of MPs

References 
 Constituencies of the National Assembly of Zambia

1964 establishments in Zambia

Constituencies established in 1964